is a Japanese voice actor affiliated with 81 Produce. Some of his best-known work includes Gaine in The Brave Express Might Gaine and Grandpa in Grandpa Danger.

Filmography

Anime
After War Gundam X (Shingo Mori)
Aoki Densetsu Shoot! (Junji Iwagami)
Brave Exkaiser (Sky Max, God Max)
The Brave Express Might Gaine (Gaine, Might Gaine, Great Might Gaine, Great Might Gaine Perfect Mode)
Colorful (Kariya)
Cromartie High School (Friend of Pootan)
Dragon Ball Z (Bun)
Flame of Recca (Mokuren Nagai)
Grandpa Danger (Grandpa)
Gurren Lagann (Dayakka)
Hunter × Hunter (2011) (Welfin)
Initial D Fourth Stage (Toru Suetsugu)
InuYasha (Orochidayu)
Monster Rancher (Gray Wolf)
Mahojin Guru Guru (Gatari (ep. 8–10))
Naruto (Inoichi Yamanaka)
Naruto Shippuden (Inoichi Yamanaka)
Pokémon (Gentleman, Yas Gym Leader)
Ranma ½ (A'sharda Kagewaki (later replaced by Takehito Koyasu), Shadow Ranma)
Rockman EXE (Thunderman)
Rockman EXE Axess (Thunderman)
Rockman EXE Stream (Thunderman)
Rockman EXE Beast+ (Thunderman, Phantom Thunderman)
Yoroiden-Samurai Troopers (Seiji Date)
Sailor Moon S (Ukon Katakuri)
Slayers (Rahanimu)
Shooting Star Rockman (Cancer)
Shooting Star Rockman Tribe (Cancer)
Yaiba (Tsukikage)
Yu-Gi-Oh! Duel Monsters GX (Kosuke Kunisaki)

Original video animation (OVA)
Bio Hunter (Police Officer)
Birdy the Mighty (Salamander)
Sohryuden: Legend of the Dragon Kings (Owaru Ryudo)
Mutant Turtles: Superman Legend (Leonardo)
Arslan Senki (Kishuard)
Iron Virgin Jun from 1992 (Kurata (Daiba) Ohnami)

Films
My Neighbor Totoro (Tractor driver)

Video games
Initial D Arcade Stage (Toru Suetsugu)
Shadow Hearts: From The New World (Killer)
Ace Combat 3 : electrosphere (JPN version) (Keith Bryan)
Mega Man Network Transmission (SwordMan)
Samurai Shodown series
Samurai Shodown 64 (Haohmaru)
Samurai Shodown 64: Warriors Rage (Haohmaru)
Samurai Shodown: Warriors Rage (Haohmaru)
Samurai Shodown (2019 video game) (Haohmaru)
Soulcalibur VI (Haohmaru)
The King of Fighters series
The King of Fighters All Star (Haohmaru)
The King of Fighters XV (Haohmaru)
Tales of series
Tales of Graces (Barry)
Tales of Graces f (Barry)
Tales of Xillia (Efreet)
Tales of Crestoria (Efreet)

Drama CDs
Gohan wo Tabeyou series 3 & 6 (Yasuhiko Kuga)
Gouka Kyakusen de Koi wa Hajimaru series 4

Tokusatsu
B-Robo Kabutack (Kuwajiro)
Kyuukyuu Sentai GoGo-V (Dark King Zylpheeza (eps. 2 - 22, 47 - 49))
Kyuukyuu Sentai GoGoFive: Sudden Shock! A New Warrior (Dark King Zylpheeza)
Ressha Sentai ToQger (Bucket Shadow (ep. 5))

Dubbing

Live-action
The Alamo (William Barret Travis (Patrick Wilson))
Coherence (Kevin (Maury Sterling))
El tiempo entre costuras (Félix Aranda (Carlos Santos))
Enter the Phoenix (Kin (Chapman To))
From Vegas to Macau (Ngau-Ngau (Chapman To))
The Hitchhiker's Guide to the Galaxy (Arthur Dent (Martin Freeman))
Machine Gun Preacher (Donnie (Michael Shannon))
Mighty Morphin Power Rangers (Jason Lee Scott (Austin St. John))
Teenage Mutant Ninja Turtles III (Leonardo)
Touching the Void (Richard Hawking)
VR Troopers (JB Reese (Michael Bacon))

Animation
Beast Machines (Tankor)
Beast Wars (Rhinox)
Biker Mice from Mars (Modo)
Donkey Kong Country (Bluster Kong)
Teenage Mutant Ninja Turtles (Leonardo)
Teenage Mutant Ninja Turtles ('87 Leonardo)
Thomas the Tank Engine and Friends (Rheneas (Season 9 onwards, succeeding Ryōtarō Okiayu) and Farmer McColl (Season 10 onwards, succeeding Yasuhiko Kawazu))
Transformers Animated (Mixmaster)

References

External links
 Official agency profile 
 Daiki Nakamura at Hitoshi Doi's Seiyuu Database
 

1962 births
81 Produce voice actors
Living people
Male voice actors from Tokyo
Japanese male video game actors
Japanese male voice actors
20th-century Japanese male actors
21st-century Japanese male actors